Hamzalar is a village in the Gölbaşı District, Adıyaman Province, Turkey. Its population is 427 (2021).

The hamlets of Hasanlar, Sırıklı and Sütlüce are attached to Hamzalar.

References

Villages in Gölbaşı District, Adıyaman Province